Thomas or Tom Lea may refer to:

 Sir Thomas Lea, 1st Baronet (1841–1902), English carpet manufacturer from Kidderminster and politician
 Thomas Calloway Lea Jr. (1877–1945), mayor of El Paso, Texas, 1915–17
 Thomas C. Lea III (1907–2001), son of Thomas C. Lea, Jr., muralist, artist, illustrator, author, LIFE war artist and correspondent
 Thomas Gibson Lea (1785–1844), American botanist
 Tom Lea (footballer), English footballer
 Thomas Lea (miller) (1757–1794), member of a prominent flour milling family in Wilmington, Delaware
 Massa Tom Lea, slave owner and ancestor of Alex Haley in Roots: The Saga of an American Family

See also
 Tom Lee (disambiguation)
 Thomas Lee (disambiguation)